John Crooks is an Australian rugby league footballer active in the 1980s. He played for the Newcastle Knights in 1988.

External links
 John Crooks at the Rugby League Project

Living people
Australian rugby league players
Newcastle Knights players
Year of birth missing (living people)
Place of birth missing (living people)